Lake Poygan, located in the U.S. state of Wisconsin near the village of Winneconne, is an expansive widening of the Wolf River totaling over 14,000 acres (57 km²). Lake Poygan is part of the Winnebago Pool or Wolf Chain, a series of interconnected lakes fed by both the Fox and Wolf rivers. The eastern third of the lake is often referred to as Lake Winneconne. In the Menominee language it is called Pawāhekaneh, "Wild Rice Threshing Lake", referring to the traditional importance of wild rice cultivation to the local economy.

Via the Wolf River, boaters can find navigable passage to Lake Butte des Morts and Lake Winnebago downstream (near Oshkosh), and upstream to Partridge Lake and Partridge Crop Lake (near Fremont and New London).

Recreation
A variety of fish species can be found in the lake, including walleye, muskellunge, white bass, largemouth bass, smallmouth bass, carp, flathead catfish, channel catfish, northern pike, crappie, yellow perch, bluegill and sturgeon. Many anglers consider Lake Poygan to be one of the most productive fisheries on the entire Winnebago Pool.

References

External links
Fishing maps and data from Lake-Link.com

Lakes of Waushara County, Wisconsin
Lakes of Winnebago County, Wisconsin